Mick van Dijke (born 15 March 2000) is a Dutch professional racing cyclist, who currently rides for UCI WorldTeam . His twin brother Tim van Dijke also rides for the same formation.

Van Dijke was contracted to join UCI WorldTeam  in the 2022 season, having signed a contract in July 2021. After showing promise with great results in 2021, it was announced that he would make an immediate transfer to the World Tour Team from early September for the remaining of the season and the following three years.

Major results

2020
 2nd Overall Orlen Nations Grand Prix
1st Stage 1 (TTT)
 2nd Road race, National Under-23 Road Championships
 9th GP Kranj
2021
 National Under-23 Road Championships
1st  Time trial
2nd Road race
 1st  Overall Flanders Tomorrow Tour
1st  Points classification
1st Stages 3a (ITT) & 4
 1st Stage 2 (TTT) Tour de l'Avenir
 1st GP Vorarlberg
 2nd Overall Kreiz Breizh Elites
1st  Young rider classification
1st Stages 1 (TTT) & 3
 3rd Overall CRO Race
1st  Young rider classification
 4th Overall Orlen Nations Grand Prix
 5th Time trial, UCI Road World Under-23 Championships
 7th Paris–Troyes
2022
 2nd Visit Friesland Elfsteden Race
 6th Overall ZLM Tour
 6th Ronde van Drenthe
 7th Overall Danmark Rundt

References

External links

2000 births
Living people
Dutch twins
Twin sportspeople
Dutch male cyclists
Sportspeople from Goes
Cyclists from Zeeland